Khalji or Khilji may refer to:

 Khalji dynasty, a dynasty that ruled parts of the Indian subcontinent during 1290–1320
 Khalji dynasty of Bengal, a dynasty that ruled Bengal during 1204–1231
 Khalji dynasty of Malwa, a dynasty that ruled Malwa during 1436–1531
 Alauddin Khalji, ruler of the Khalji dynasty
 Khalaj people, a Turkic people
 Khalaj language, a Turkic language
 Khilji, Nepal, a village in Nepal
 Ghilji or Khilji, a Pashtun tribal confederacy